St. George is an unincorporated community in central Wright County, in the U.S. state of Missouri. The community is located on St. George Road, just southwest of Missouri Route H and four miles east of Manes. The site is in Hillhouse Hollow, a tributary of the Gasconade River.

History
A post office called Saint George was in operation from 1872 until 1958. The community has the name of the local St. George family.

References

Unincorporated communities in Wright County, Missouri
Unincorporated communities in Missouri